Archduke (feminine: Archduchess; German: Erzherzog, feminine form: Erzherzogin) was the title borne from 1358 by the Habsburg rulers of the Archduchy of Austria, and later by all senior members of that dynasty. It denotes a rank within the former Holy Roman Empire (962–1806), which was below that of Emperor and King, roughly equal to Grand Duke, but above that of a Prince and Duke.

The territory ruled by an Archduke or Archduchess was called an Archduchy. All remaining Archduchies ceased to exist in 1918. The current head of the House of Habsburg is Karl von Habsburg.

Terminology
The English word is first recorded in 1530, derived from Middle French , a 15th-century derivation from Medieval Latin , from Latin - (Greek ) meaning "authority" or "primary" (see arch-) and  "duke" (literally "leader").

"Archduke" is a title distinct from "Grand Duke", a later monarchic title borne by the rulers of other European countries (for instance, Luxembourg).

History
The Latin title archidux is first attested in reference to Bruno the Great, who ruled simultaneously as Archbishop of Cologne and Duke of Lotharingia in the 10th century, in the work of his biographer Ruotger. In Ruotger, the title served as an honorific denoting Bruno's unusual position rather than a formal office.

The title was not used systematically until the 14th century, when the title "Archduke of Austria" was invented in the forged Privilegium Maius (1358–1359) by Duke Rudolf IV of Austria, called Rudolf the Founder (German: Rudolf der Stifter). Rudolf originally claimed the title in the form palatinus archidux ("palatine archduke"). The title was intended to emphasize the claimed precedence (thus "Arch-") of the Duchy of Austria, in an effort to put the Habsburgs on an even level with the Prince-Electors of the Holy Roman Empire, as Austria had been passed over when the Golden Bull of 1356 assigned that dignity to the four highest-ranking secular Imperial princes and three Archbishops. Holy Roman Emperor Charles IV refused to recognise the title, as did all the other ruling dynasties of the member countries of the Empire. But Duke Ernest the Iron and his descendants unilaterally assumed the title of Archduke.

The archducal title was only officially recognized in 1453 by Emperor Frederick III, when the Habsburgs had solidified their grip on the throne of the de jure elected Holy Roman Emperor, making it de facto hereditary. Despite that imperial authorization of the title, which showed a Holy Roman Emperor from the Habsburg dynasty deciding over a title claim of the Habsburg dynasty, many ruling dynasties of the countries which formed the Empire refused to recognize the title "Archduke". Ladislaus the Posthumous, Duke of Austria, who died in 1457, never got in his lifetime the imperial authorization to use it, and accordingly, neither he nor anyone in his branch of the dynasty ever used the title. Emperor Frederick III himself simply used the title "Duke of Austria", never Archduke, until his death in 1493. The title was first granted to Frederick's younger brother, Albert VI of Austria (d. 1463), who used it at least from 1458.

In 1477, Frederick III also granted the title of Archduke to his first cousin, Sigismund of Austria, ruler of Further Austria. Frederick's son and heir, the future Emperor Maximilian I, started to use the title, but apparently only after the death of his wife Mary of Burgundy (d. 1482), as Archduke never appears in documents issued jointly by Maximilian and Mary as rulers in the Low Countries (where Maximilian is still titled "Duke of Austria"). The title appears first in documents issued under the joint rule of Maximilian and his son Philip in the Low Countries.

Archduke was initially borne by those dynasts who ruled a Habsburg territory—i.e., only by males and their consorts, appanages being commonly distributed to cadets. But these "junior" archdukes did not thereby become sovereign hereditary rulers, since all territories remained vested in the Austrian crown. Occasionally a territory might be combined with a separate gubernatorial mandate ruled by an archducal cadet.

Usage
From the 16th century onward, "Archduke" and its female form, "Archduchess", came to be used by all the members of the House of Habsburg (e.g. Queen Marie Antoinette of France was born Archduchess Maria Antonia of Austria). Upon extinction of the male line of the Habsburgs and the marriage of their heiress, the Holy Roman Empress-consort Maria Theresa, Queen of Hungary and Archduchess of Austria, to Francis Stephen, Duke of Lorraine, who was elected Holy Roman Emperor, their descendants formed the House of Habsburg-Lorraine. After the dissolution of the Holy Roman Empire this usage was retained in the Austrian Empire (1804–1867) and the Austro-Hungarian Empire (1867–1918).

The official use of titles of nobility and of all other hereditary titles, including Archduke, has been illegal in the Republic of Austria for Austrian citizens since the Law on the Abolition of Nobility (Gesetz vom 3. April 1919 über die Aufhebung des Adels, der weltlichen Ritter- und Damenorden und gewisser Titel und Würden). Thus those members of the Habsburg family who are residents of the Republic of Austria are simply known by their first name(s) and their surname Habsburg-Lothringen. However, members of the family who reside in other countries may or may not use the title, in accordance with laws and customs in those nations.

For example, Otto Habsburg-Lothringen (1912–2011), the eldest son of the last Habsburg Emperor, was an Austrian, Hungarian and German citizen. As he lived in Germany, where it is permitted to use hereditary titles as part of the civil surname (including indications of origin, such as von or zu), his official civil name was Otto von Habsburg (literally: Otto of Habsburg), whereas in Austria he was registered as Otto Habsburg.

The King of Spain also bears the nominal title of Archduke of Austria as part of his full list of titles, as the Bourbon dynasty adopted all the titles previously held by the Spanish Habsburgs when they took over the Spanish throne. However, "Archduke" was never considered by the Spanish Bourbons as a substantial dignity of their own dynasty, but rather as a traditional supplementary title of the Spanish Kings since the days of the Habsburg dynasty on the royal throne (1516–1700). Hence, no member of the royal family other than the King bears the (additional) title of "Archduke".

Insignia 
The insignia of the Archduke of Lower and Upper Austria was the archducal hat, a coronet which is kept in Klosterneuburg Monastery.

See also
 List of rulers of Austria
 List of Austrian consorts

References and notes

External links 
 

14th-century establishments in Austria
Austrian noble titles
German noble titles
House of Habsburg
Men's social titles
Noble titles created in 1358
Royal titles